Eurycantha horrida, the thorny devil walking stick, is a species belonging to the stick insects (order Phasmatodea) and to the family Phasmatidae.

Description

The body color ranges from pale green to brown. The young  insects are glossy greenish. These  ground-dwelling stick insects resemble bark or rotten wood. They have numerous small spines on their body and on their hind legs. Both sexes are wingless and look very similar. They exhibit the sexual dimorphism of many phasmids, as the males are darker, smaller and thinner and have enlarged hind leg femurs with a curved spine or thorn on the underneath side. Females are also  brighter than the males and have a larger abdomen tipped with a beak-shaped ovipositor with which they lay the eggs in damp soil.

Distribution and habitat
This species occurs in Papua New Guinea. It can be found in tropical rainforests in trees, shrubs and ground litter.

Life cycle
The eggs hatch after about 4 months. Young insects mature after about 5–6 molts in 4 to 6 months. Life expectancy from hatching to the death is of about 2 years. They are nocturnal and they feed on a wide range of plants, mainly on leaves of Rosaceae species (blackberry, raspberry, wild rose, hawthorn, cherry, cotoneaster, etc.) but also on leaves of oak, beech, hazel, chestnut, eucalyptus, etc.

References

External links
 Reptarium

Phasmatodea
Insects of Papua New Guinea
Insects described in 1835